Piața Rosetti is a small square in Sector 2 of Bucharest, 250 metres from Piața Universității.

The square is named after former mayor of Bucharest, Romanian statesman, and 1848 revolutionary C. A. Rosetti. It was designed as part of the modernisation efforts of ex-mayor  in 1888.

The  is a historic monument located at the intersection of Carol I and Hristo Botev Boulevards, overlooking Rosetti Square.

Squares in Bucharest